Forest Hill Vineyard (also referred to as Forest Hill Wines) is an Australian winery business based in the Great Southern wine region of Western Australia.  Its vineyard is west of Mount Barker, and its winery and cellar door are further south, at Denmark.

The vineyard, the first to be established in the region, dates back to 1965.  Initially, it was planted by the Department of Agriculture as an experiment in diversification, on land leased from Tony and Betty Pearse for 10 years.  The first plantings were a dismal failure, but two hectares were successfully established in 1966.  The vines planted in that year, one hectare each of riesling and cabernet sauvignon, grew only very slowly in the cool climate.

In 1972, the first commercial vintage was made from the vineyard's grapes by Jack Mann at Houghton in the Swan Valley.  The next three vintages were made by Dorham Mann at Sandalford, also in the Swan Valley.  They included the 1975 riesling, which, under the Sandalford label, won 12 gold medals and nine trophies.

The success of the early vintages encouraged others to set up wineries nearby.

See also

 Australian wine
 List of wineries in Western Australia
 Western Australian wine

References

Notes

Bibliography

External links
Official Forest Hill Vineyard website

Wineries in Western Australia
Great Southern (Western Australia)
Food and drink companies established in 1965
Australian companies established in 1965